Rosedale is a census-designated place (CDP) located in Pierce County, Washington.

A post office called Rosedale was established in 1887, and remained in operation until 1918. The community was named for roses near the original town site.

Demographics
In 2010, it had a population of 4,044 inhabitants. 1,478 are male. 2,566 are female.

Geography
Rosedale is located at coordinates 47°20′27″N 122°37′59″W.

References

Census-designated places in Pierce County, Washington